This is an inclompete list of Swedish-language novels.

Nineteenth century

1830s
 Det går an – Carl Jonas Love Almqvist (1839)

1870s
 The Red Room – August Strindberg (1879)

1880s
 The Son of a Servant – August Strindberg (1886)

1890s
 The Story of Gösta Berling – Selma Lagerlöf (1891)
 Förvillelser – Hjalmar Söderberg (1895)
 The Tale of a Manor – Selma Lagerlöf (1899)

Twentieth century

1900s

 Martin Birck's Youth – Hjalmar Söderberg (1901)
 Jerusalem – Selma Lagerlöf (1901)
 Alone – August Strindberg (1903)
 The Treasure – Selma Lagerlöf (1904)
 Doctor Glas – Hjalmar Söderberg (1905)
 The Wonderful Adventures of Nils – Selma Lagerlöf (1906)
 The Girl from the Marsh Croft – Selma Lagerlöf (1908)
 Norrtullsligan – Elin Wägner (1908)

1910s
 Sörgården – Anna-Maria Roos (1912)
 The Serious Game – Hjalmar Söderberg (1912)
 Thy Soul Shall Bear Witness! – Selma Lagerlöf (1912)
 The Emperor of Portugallia – Selma Lagerlöf (1914)

1920s

 Farmor och vår Herre – Hjalmar Bergman (1921)
 Kvartetten som sprängdes – Birger Sjöberg (1924)
 Gäst hos verkligheten – Pär Lagerkvist (1925)
 The Löwensköld Ring – Selma Lagerlöf (1925)
 Charlotte Löwensköld – Selma Lagerlöf (1925)
 Snörmakare Lekholm får en idé – Gustaf Hellström (1927)
 Raskens – Vilhelm Moberg (1927)
 Anna Svärd – Selma Lagerlöf (1928)

1930s

 Bock i örtagård – Fritiof Nilsson Piraten (1933)
 Godnatt jord – Ivar Lo-Johansson (1933)
 Kvinnor och äppelträd – Moa Martinson (1933)
 Nu var det 1914 – Eyvind Johnson (1934)
 Here's Your Life – Eyvind Johnson (1935)
 Flowering Nettle – Harry Martinson (1935)
 Kungsgatan – Ivar Lo-Johansson (1935)
 Jag Lars Hård – Jan Fridegård (1935)
 Se dig inte om! – Eyvind Johnson (1936)
 My Mother Gets Married – Moa Martinson (1936)
 Slutspel i ungdomen – Eyvind Johnson (1937)
 Bokhandlaren som slutade bada – Fritiof Nilsson Piraten (1937)
 Sömnlös – Vilhelm Moberg (1937)
 Bara en mor – Ivar Lo-Johansson (1939)

1940s

 Trägudars land – Jan Fridegård (1940)
 Kallocain – Karin Boye (1940)
 The Hammer of God – Bo Giertz (1941)
 Väckarklocka – Elin Wägner (1941)
 Grupp Krilon – Eyvind Johnson (1941)
 The Long Ships – Frans G. Bengtsson (1941)
 Ride This Night – Vilhelm Moberg (1941)
 Krilons resa – Eyvind Johnson (1942)
 Krilon själv – Eyvind Johnson (1943)
 The Dwarf – Pär Lagerkvist (1944)
 Soldat med brutet gevär – Vilhelm Moberg (1944)
 Min död är min – Lars Ahlin (1945)
 The Snake – Stig Dagerman (1945)
 Return to Ithaca – Eyvind Johnson (1946)
 The Island of the Doomed – Stig Dagerman (1946)
 A Burnt Child – Stig Dagerman (1948)
 Vägen till Klockrike – Harry Martinson (1948)
 The Emigrants – Vilhelm Moberg (1949)
 Dreams of Roses and Fire – Eyvind Johnson (1949)

1950s

 Barabbas – Pär Lagerkvist (1950)
 Solange – Willy Kyrklund (1951)
 Unto a Good Land – Vilhelm Moberg (1952)
 Hjortronlandet – Sara Lidman (1955)
 The Settlers – Vilhelm Moberg (1956)
 Natt i marknadstältet – Lars Ahlin (1957)
 The Last Letter Home – Vilhelm Moberg (1959)

1960s

 The Days of His Grace – Eyvind Johnson (1960)
 City of My Dreams – Per Anders Fogelström (1960)
 Children of Their City – Per Anders Fogelström (1962)
 A Time on Earth – Vilhelm Moberg (1963)
 Remember the City – Per Anders Fogelström (1964)
 Moominpappa at Sea – Tove Jansson (1965)
 In a City Transformed – Per Anders Fogelström (1966)
 Stad i världen – Per Anders Fogelström (1968)
 Vem älskar Yngve Frej? – Stig Claesson (1968)

1970s

 Rapport från en skurhink – Maja Ekelöf (1970)
 De långa åren – Eino Hanski (1972)
 Attila – Klas Östergren (1975)
 Det mest förbjudna – Kerstin Thorvall (1976)
 Jack – Ulf Lundell (1976)
 Maken – Gun-Britt Sundström (1976)
 Ismael – Klas Östergren (1977)
 Din tjänare hör – Sara Lidman (1977)
 Fantomerna – Klas Östergren (1978)
 Musikanternas uttåg – P O Enquist (1978)
 Autisterna – Stig Larsson (1979)
 Pubertet – Ivar Lo-Johansson (1979)
 Vredens barn – Sara Lidman (1979)

1980s

 Gentlemen – Klas Östergren (1980)
 Evil – Jan Guillou (1981)
 Agnes Cecilia – en sällsam historia – Maria Gripe (1981)
 Naboth's Stone – Sara Lidman (1981)
 Samuels bok – Sven Delblanc (1981)
 The Way of a Serpent – Torgny Lindgren (1982)
 The Christmas Oratorio – Göran Tunström (1983)
 Fattiga riddare och stora svenskar – Klas Östergren (1983)
 Den underbare mannen – Sara Lidman (1983)
 Sagan om Sune – Anders Jacobsson & Sören Olsson (1984)
 Dykungens dotter – en barnhistoria – Birgitta Trotzig (1985)
 Far och son – Jörn Donner (1985)
 Simon and the Oaks – Marianne Fredriksson (1985)
 Paradisets barn – Marianne Fredriksson (1985)
 Järnkronan – Sara Lidman (1985)
 Sune börjar tvåan – Anders Jacobsson & Sören Olsson (1985)
 Hunden – Kerstin Ekman (1986)
 Plåster – Klas Östergren (1986)
 Självklart, Sune – Anders Jacobsson & Sören Olsson (1986)
 Vindspejare – Agneta Pleijel (1987)
 Berts dagbok – Anders Jacobsson & Sören Olsson (1987)
 Din livsfrukt – Lars Ahlin (1987)
 Rövarna i Skuleskogen – Kerstin Ekman (1988)
 Ankare – Klas Östergren (1988)
 Den som vandrar om natten – Marianne Fredriksson (1988)
 Sune och Svarta Mannen – Anders Jacobsson & Sören Olsson (1989)
 Tjejtjusaren Sune – Anders Jacobsson & Sören Olsson (1989)

1990s

 Berts första betraktelser – Anders Jacobsson & Sören Olsson (1990)
 Berts vidare betraktelser – Anders Jacobsson & Sören Olsson (1990)
 Berts ytterligare betraktelser – Anders Jacobsson & Sören Olsson (1991)
 Berts bravader – Anders Jacobsson & Sören Olsson (1991)
 Handelsmän och partisaner – Klas Östergren (1991)
 Livets ax – Sven Delblanc (1991)
 Berts bekännelser – Anders Jacobsson & Sören Olsson (1991)
 En komikers uppväxt – Jonas Gardell (1992)
 Medan tiden tänker på annat – Niklas Rådström (1992)
 Strandmannen – Peter Kihlgård (1992)
 Korta och långa kapitel – Sigrid Combüchen (1992)
 Saknaden – Ulf Lundell (1992)
 Bert och badbrudarna – Anders Jacobsson & Sören Olsson (1993)
 Fungi – Agneta Pleijel (1993)
 Medan de ännu hade hästar – Birgitta Lillpers (1993)
 Urwind – Bo Carpelan (1993)
 Blackwater – Kerstin Ekman (1993)
 Nedkomst – Magnus Dahlström (1993)
 Berts bekymmer – Anders Jacobsson & Sören Olsson (1994)
 Synden – Björn Ranelid (1994)
 Den dagen kastanjerna slår ut är jag långt härifrån – Bodil Malmsten (1994)
 Andrej – Carola Hansson (1994)
 Under i september – Klas Östergren (1994)
 Vattenorgeln – Lars Andersson (1994)
 Bert och brorosrna – Anders Jacobsson & Sören Olsson (1995)
 Berts bryderier – Anders Jacobsson & Sören Olsson (1995)
 Comédia infantil – Henning Mankell (1995)
 En ny påminnelse om – Lennart Göth (1995)
 Trädgården – Magnus Florin (1995)
 Värddjuret – Marie Hermanson (1995)
 Underbara kvinnor vid vatten – Monika Fagerholm (1995)
 Rymdväktaren – Peter Nilson (1995)
 Sweetness – Torgny Lindgren (1995)
 Molnfri bombnatt – Vibeke Olsson (1995)
 En tid i Visby – Björn Runeborg (1996)
 Bert och boysen – Anders Jacobsson & Sören Olsson (1996)
 Berts berifelse – Anders Jacobsson & Sören Olsson (1996)
 Den tionde sånggudinnan – Carina Burman (1996)
 Jag vill ha hela världen! – Fredrik Ekelund (1996)
 Drakarna över Helsingfors – Kjell Westö (1996)
 Lifsens rot – Sara Lidman (1996)
 Bert och bacillerna – Anders Jacobsson & Sören Olsson (1993)
 Bert och beundrarinnorna – Anders Jacobsson & Sören Olsson (1997)
 Hohaj – Elisabeth Rynell (1997)
 Huset vid Flon – Kjell Johansson (1997)
 Hem – Magnus Dahlström (1997)
 April Witch – Majgull Axelsson (1997)
 Enligt Maria Magdalena – Marianne Fredriksson (1997)
 Svindel – Per Holmer (1997)
 Mosippan – Elsie Johansson (1998)
 Berömda män som varit i Sunne – Göran Tunström (1998)
 Syskonen – Magnus Florin (1998)
 Sena sagor – PC Jersild (1998)
 Parsifal – Sigrid Combüchen (1998)
 Väduren – Björn Runeborg (1999)
 Det hemliga namnet – Inger Edelfeldt (1999)
 Vargskinnet – Guds barmhärtighet – Kerstin Ekman (1999)
 The Visit of the Royal Physician – Per Olov Enquist (1999)
 Oskuldens minut – Sara Lidman (1999)
 Stämma i havet – Stewe Claeson (1999)

Twenty-first century

2000s

 Hässja – Åke Smedberg (2000)
 Jag smyger förbi en yxa – Beate Grimsrud (2000)
 Den älskvärde – Carola Hansson (2000)
 Tio syskon i en ömtålig berättelse – Kerstin Strandberg (2000)
 I den Röda Damens slott – Lars Jakobson (2000)
 Popular Music from Vittula – Mikael Niemi (2000)
 Lord Nevermore – Agneta Pleijel (2001)
 Vandrarna – Jan Henrik Swahn (2001)
 Min faders hus – Kerstin Norborg (2001)
 Pompeji – Maja Lundgren (2001)
 Lewis resa – Per Olov Enquist (2001)
 Underdog – Torbjörn Flygt (2001)
 The Horrific Sufferings of the Mind-Reading Monster Hercules Barefoot – Carl-Johan Vallgren (2002)
 Till Mervas – Elisabeth Rynell (2002)
 Min faders hus – Kerstin Norborg (2002)
 Berget – Lars Andersson (2002)
 Band II Från Gabbro till Löväng – Lotta Lotass (2002)
 Ciona – en självbiologi – Tamara T. (2002)
 Polarsommar – Anne Swärd (2003)
 Imago – Eva-Marie Liffner (2003)
 Ett öga rött – Jonas Hassen Khemiri (2003)
 Lottery Scratchcards – Kerstin Ekman (2003)
 En simtur i sundet – Sigrid Combüchen (2003)
 Ravensbrück – Steve Sem-Sandberg (2003)
 Pölsan – Torgny Lindgren (2003)
 Gregorius – Bengt Ohlsson (2004)
 Öde – Christine Falkenland (2004)
 En obeskrivlig människa – Kerstin Strandberg (2004)
 Tredje flykthastigheten – Lotta Lotass (2004)
 Boken om Blanche och Marie – Per Olov Enquist (2004)
 Berg – Bo Carpelan (2005)
 Simone de Beauvoirs hjärta – Ann-Marie Ljungberg (2005)
 Gangsters – Klas Östergren (2005)
 Job – Kristian Lundberg (2005)
 skymning:gryning – Lotta Lotass (2005)
 The American Girl – Monika Fagerholm (2005)
 I min ungdom speglade jag mig ofta – Per Gunnar Evander (2005)
 Förvandling – Eva Adolfsson (2006)
 Easy Money – Jens Lapidus (2006)
 Montecore: The Silence of the Tiger – Jonas Hassen Khemiri (2006)
 Göteborgshändelserna – Jörgen Gassilewski (2006)
 Där vi en gång gått  – Kjell Westö (2006)
 Den amerikanska flickans söndagar – Lars Gustafsson (2006)
 Drömfakulteten – Sara Stridsberg (2006)
 Svinalängorna – Susanna Alakoski (2006)
 Mig äger ingen – Åsa Linderborg (2007)
 Har någon sett mig någon annanstans? – Beate Grimsrud (2007)
 Stundande natten – Carl-Henning Wijkmark (2007)
 Världens sista roman – Daniel Sjölin (2007)
 The Hurricane Party – Klas Östergren (2007)
 Norrlands Akvavit – Torgny Lindgren (2007)
 Synopsis – Ulf Karl Olov Nilsson (2007)
 Dag – Björn Runeborg (2008)
 Never Screw Up – Jens Lapidus (2008)
 Edelcrantz förbindelser – Malte Persson (2008)
 Reglerna – Sara Mannheimer (2008)
 Den siste greken – Aris Fioretos (2009)
 Sin ensamma kropp – Elsie Johansson (2009)
 En liten historia – Eva Adolfsson (2009)
 The Hundred-Year-Old Man Who Climbed Out the Window and Disappeared – Jonas Jonasson (2009)
 Den sista cigaretten – Klas Östergren (2009)
 Yarden – Kristian Lundberg (2009)
 Hotel Galicja – Per Agne Erkelius (2009)
 The Emperor of Lies – Steve Sem-Sandberg (2009)

2010s

 Skulle jag dö under andra himlar – Johannes Anyuru (2010)
 Att föda ett barn – Kristina Sandberg (2010)
 Ränderna – Magnus Florin (2010)
 Kioskvridning 140 grader – En wästern – Peter Törnqvist (2010)
 Darling River – Sara Stridsberg (2010)
 Spill. En damroman – Sigrid Combüchen (2010)
 Bret Easton Ellis and the Other Dogs – Lina Wolff (2010)
 Välkommen till den här världen – Amanda Svensson (2011)
 En dåre fri – Beate Grimsrud (2011)
 Rekviem för John Cummings – Bengt Ohlsson (2011)
 Flod – Carolina Fredriksson (2011)
 Lacrimosa – Eva-Marie Liffner (2011)
 Life Deluxe – Jens Lapidus (2011)
 En kubikmeter jord – Sören Bondeson (2011)
 Korparna – Tomas Bannerhed (2011)
 Springa med åror – Cilla Naumann (2012)
 Ingenbarnsland – Eija Hetekivi Olsson (2012)
 A Brief Stop on the Road from Auschwitz – Göran Rosenberg (2012)
 En storm kom från paradiset – Johannes Anyuru (2012)
 Torka aldrig tårar utan handskar: Kärleken – Jonas Gardell (2012)
 Och allt skall vara kärlek – Kristian Lundberg (2012)
 Sörja för de sina – Kristina Sandberg (2012)
 Sång till den storm som ska komma – Peter Fröberg Idling (2012)
 Is – Ulla-Lena Lundberg (2012)
 Vinterträdet – Ellen Mattson (2012)
 Skuggland – Jonas Brun (2013)
 Torka aldrig tårar utan handskar: Döden – Jonas Gardell (2013)
 Torka aldrig tårar utan handskar: Sjukdomen – Jonas Gardell (2013)
 Mirage 38 – Kjell Westö (2013)
 Wilful Disregard – Lena Andersson (2013)
 Liknelseboken. En kärleksroman – Per Olov Enquist (2013)
 Porslinsfasaderna – Sven Olov Karlsson (2013)
 Alkemistens dotter – Carl-Michael Edenborg (2014)
 Twist – Klas Östergren (2014)
 Liv till varje pris – Kristina Sandberg (2014)
 Utan personligt ansvar – Lena Andersson (2014)
 Ett så starkt ljus – Lyra Ekström Lindbäck (2014)
 Beckomberga. Ode till min familj – Sara Stridsberg (2014)
 De utvalda – Steve Sem-Sandberg (2014)
 Kafkapaviljongen – Tony Samuelsson (2014)
 Allt jag inte minns – Jonas Hassen Khemiri (2015)
 Mary – Aris Fioretos (2015)
 The Polyglot Lovers – Lina Wolff (2016)
 Tornet och fåglarna – Ellen Mattson (2017)
 Den svavelgula himlen – Kjell Westö (2017)
 Vera – Anne Swärd (2017)
 Nelly B:s hjärta – Aris Fioretos (2018)
 Kärlekens antarktis – Sara Stridsberg (2019)

2020s

 Renegater'' – Klas Östergren (2020)

See also
List of Swedish-language novels translated into English

Swedish-language literature
Lists of novels